"The Bells" is a rhythm and blues song written by Billy Ward and Rose Ann Marks and recorded by Billy Ward and His Dominoes in 1952, featuring Clyde McPhatter on lead tenor. It was released on Federal Records as the B-side of the group's single "Pedal Pushin' Papa". It was a bigger hit than the A-side, reaching #3 on the R&B chart. ("Pedal Pushin' Papa" charted #4 R&B.)

James Brown version
"The Bells" played an important part in the early careers of James Brown and The Famous Flames. In their performances on the Chitlin' Circuit the group would act out the story of bereavement told in the lyrics, pushing a doll representing the dead woman across the stage in a baby carriage. As they passed Brown, he would fall to his knees crying and sobbing, eventually segueing into "Please, Please, Please". The routine was so popular that audiences sometimes became violent if they tried to perform the song without it.

Brown recorded "The Bells" in 1960 as his first single for King Records. It reached number 68 on the Billboard pop chart.

References

Billy Ward and his Dominoes songs
Songs written by Billy Ward (singer)
Songs written by Rose Marks
James Brown songs
1952 songs
1960 singles
Federal Records singles
King Records (United States) singles